Sai Kung East Country Park is a country park on the Sai Kung Peninsula in Hong Kong, measuring . It opened in 1978 and has features including:

 High Island Reservoir
 High Island
 Pak Tam Au
 Sheung Yiu
 Wong Shek Pier
 Beaches of Tai Long Wan: Sai Wan, Ham Tin Wan, Tai Wan and Tung Wan.
 Sharp Peak
 Po Pin Chau
 Conic Island (Fan Tsang Chau)
 Long Ke Wan
 Luk Wu
 Long Harbour
 Chek Keng

Villages
 Ko Lau Wan
 Tan Ka Wan

See also
 Hong Kong National Geopark
Sai Kung West Country Park

References

Sai Kung East Country Park on AFCD website

Sai Kung Peninsula
Sai Kung District
Country parks and special areas of Hong Kong
1978 establishments in Hong Kong